Yağmur Uraz (born February 19, 1990) is a Turkish football striker currently playing in the First League for Galatasaray with jersey number 11. She played in the Turkey women's U-19 national teams before joining the Turkish national team.

Club career 

Yağmur Uraz began football playing in the Ankara club Gazi Üniversitesispor by receiving her license on March 4, 2003. She played in all the age teams of the club, and became finally part of the senior team in the 2008–09 season. In the 2009–09 season, she enjoyed Women's First League championship. The next season, she transferred to Ataşehir Belediyesi, which became two successive seasons league champion.

Uraz made her Champions League debut in August 2011. She netted a goal for Ataşehir Belediyesi in the 2012–13 UEFA Women's Champions League match against the Slovenian team ŽNK Pomurje. In the UEFA Women's Euro 2013 qualifying – Group 2 round match against Switzerland, she scored the only goal for the national team.

Konak Belediyespor 
On January 10, 2014, she was transferred by the Izmir-based Konak Belediyespor, which was league champion of the 2012–13 season. She will be playing the 2013–14 season's second half matches with Konak Belediyespor.

Kireçburnu Spor 
For the 2015–16 season, she signed with Kireçburnu Spor, which was recently promoted to the Women's First League.

Ataşehir Belediyespor 
Uraz returned to her former club Ataşehir Belediyespor for the 2016–17 season. She enjoyed her team's champion title at the end of the 2017-18 season, and played in three matches of the 2018–19 UEFA Women's Champions League scoring three goals.

ALG Spor 
In the second half of the 2018–19 season, she transferred to the recently promoted Gaziantep-based club ALG Spor.

Beşiktaş J.K. 
She was transferred by the 2018–19 Women's First League champion Beşiktaş J.K. to play in the 2019–20 UEFA Women's Champions League - Group 9 matches. She scored one goal of her team in the second game against the Dutch FC Twente Vrouwen.

Following her team's champions title in the 2020-21 Turkcell League season, she played in two matches of the 2021–22 UEFA Women's Champions League qualifying rounds, and scored a foal against ŽFK Kamenica Sasa from North Macedonia.

Galatasaray S.K. 
On 10 August 2022, the Turkish Women's Football Super League team was transferred to the Galatasaray club.

UEFA Women's Champions League goals

International career 

In the UEFA Women's Euro 2009 qualifying round held in Turkey, Yağmur Uraz scored two goals against the Georgian team, She shot two goals each in the matches against Malta at the 2011 FIFA Women's World Cup qualification – UEFA Group 5 in 2010.

Uraz netted the only goal for her country in the UEFA Women's Euro 2013 qualifying – Group 2 match against the Swiss women. On November 28, 2013, she scored the second goal for Turkey in the 2015 FIFA Women's World Cup qualification – UEFA Group 6 match against Montenegron team that ended with 3–1. She netted each one goal in the matches against Belarus and Montenegro, and two goals in the home match against Belarus at the same tournament.

She played at all five matches of the 2023 FIFA Women's World Cup qualification – UEFA Group H, and scored a goal against Bulgaria.

National team goals

Career statistics

Honours 
 Turkish Women's First League
Gazi Üniversitesispor
 Winners (3): 2006–07, 2007–08, 2009–10
 Third places (1): 2008–09

 Ataşehir Belediyespor
 Winners (2): 2010–11, 2011–12, 2017–18
 Runners-up (1): 2012–13
 Third places (1):2015–17

 Konak Belediyespor
 Winners (2): 2013–14, 2014–15

 ALG Spor
 Runners-ups (1): 2018–19

 Beşiktaş J.K.
 Winners (1): 2020-21

References 

1990 births
Living people
Footballers from Ankara
Turkish women's footballers
Women's association football forwards
Gazi Üniversitesispor players
Ataşehir Belediyespor players
Konak Belediyespor players
Kireçburnu Spor players
ALG Spor players
Beşiktaş J.K. women's football players
Turkish Women's Football Super League players
Turkey women's international footballers
Galatasaray S.K. women's football players
21st-century Turkish sportswomen